Hot Dog is an album by jazz saxophonist Lou Donaldson recorded for the Blue Note label in 1969 and featuring Donaldson with Ed Williams, Charles Earland, Melvin Sparks, and Leo Morris. The album features Donaldson using the varitone amplification system for his saxophone.

The album was awarded 2 ½ stars in an AllMusic review by Steve Huey, who states:
A wildly erratic slice of funky soul-jazz in keeping with Lou Donaldson's late-'60s commercial accessibility, Hot Dog isn't a total washout, but it's just as hit-and-miss [sic] as many of Donaldson's albums from the era (even if you are a fan of the style)... Hot Dog does have some worthwhile moments; it's just a pity the overall finished product isn't more consistent".

Track listing
All compositions by Lou Donaldson except as indicated
 "Who's Making Love?" (Homer Banks, Bettye Crutcher, Don Davis, Raymond Jackson) – 6:46
 "Turtle Walk" – 7:56
 "Bonnie" (Tommy Turrentine) – 4:56
 "Hot Dog" – 10:45
 "It's Your Thing" (Rudolph Isley, O'Kelly Isley, Ronald Isley) – 8:59

Personnel
 Lou Donaldson - varitone alto saxophone, vocals
 Ed Williams - trumpet
 Charles Earland - Hammond organ
 Melvin Sparks - guitar
 Leo Morris - drums

References

External links
 

Lou Donaldson albums
1969 albums
Albums produced by Francis Wolff
Blue Note Records albums
Jazz-funk albums
Albums recorded at Van Gelder Studio